Celastrina nigra, the dusky azure, is a butterfly in the family Lycaenidae.  The species was first described by William Trowbridge Merrifield Forbes in 1960. It resides in the extreme northeast corner of the U.S. state of Georgia. The larval host plant is Aruncus dioicus (goat's beard).

References

nigra
Butterflies of North America
Butterflies described in 1960